HMS TB 23  was a Cricket-class coastal destroyer or torpedo-boat of the British Royal Navy. TB 23 was built by the shipbuilder Yarrow from 1907 to 1908. She was used for local patrol duties in the First World War and was sold for scrap in 1921.

Design
The Cricket-class was intended as a smaller and cheaper supplement to the large, fast, but expensive Tribal-class destroyer, particularly in coastal waters such as the English Channel. Twelve ships were ordered under the 1905–1906 shipbuilding programme, with 12 more ordered in November 1906 under the 1906–1907 programme. The 1906–1907 orders were distributed with four ships being built by J. Samuel White, two by Denny, two by Thornycroft, two by Hawthorn Leslie and one each by Palmers and Yarrow.

The ships had turtleback forecastles and two funnels. Two oil-fuelled Yarrow water-tube boilers fed steam to three-stage Parsons steam turbines, driving three propeller shafts.

Armament consisted of two 12-pounder (76-mm) 12 cwt guns, and three 18-inch (450 mm) torpedo tubes (in three single mounts). The ship had a crew of 35.

Service
TB 23 was laid down at Yarrow's Cubitt Town, London shipyard on 10 February 1907, was launched on 5 December 1907 and completed on 19 February 1908.

Later that month she was struck by the gunboat  while tied up at a buoy, damaging the torpedo-boat's stem.

In March 1913, TB 23 was based at Chatham, in commission, but with a nucleus crew, and remained at Chatham in July 1914. In November 1914, TB 23 was listed as part of the Local Defence Flotilla for The Nore, which had the duty of defending the Thames Estuary. She remained part of The Nore Local Defence Flotilla in December 1918.

By January 1919, TB 23, although still at the Nore, had left the Local Defence Flotilla, and by May, was listed as in Reserve at the Nore. By January 1920, TB 23 was, together with most of the remaining torpedo boats, listed as being for sale. She was sold to the shipbreaker Wards for scrapping at their Grays, Essex, yard on  9 May 1921, one of twelve Cricket-class ex-coastal destroyers sold to Wards on that day.

Notes

Citations

Bibliography

 

Torpedo boats of the Royal Navy
1907 ships